The Pin is a comedy double-act composed of Ben Ashenden and Alex Owen. They wrote and starred in a BBC Radio 4 show of the same name from 2015 to 2019.

Background 
The double act met at the University of Cambridge, where they joined the Cambridge Footlights. Whilst members, they co-wrote and performed the sketch show ‘Good Clean Men’ with Joey Batey, Joe Bannister, Mark Fiddaman and Simon Haines, and they co-wrote and performed in two international tour shows: 2010's 'Good For You,' directed by Liam Williams and Daran Johnson, and 2011's 'Pretty Little Panic' directed by Keith Akushie and James Moran.

'The Pin' was originally the title of a show written and performed by Ashenden, Owen, and original member Mark Fiddaman in their final year at Cambridge in 2011. After graduating, the three moved to London and started developing shows at the Invisible Dot comedy club to take to the Edinburgh Festival Fringe. The Pin became a duo when Fiddaman left to pursue graduate studies at the University of Oxford.

Works 
Their shows at Edinburgh have garnered great critical acclaim from the likes of The Guardian, The Sunday Times, The Daily Telegraph, and more.

In 2015 the pair's debut BBC Radio 4 series aired, followed by a second series in 2016, and a third, this time in the 6.30 pm slot, with half-hour long episodes.

In 2021, they guest starred in an episode of BBC comedy Ghosts.

The Comeback 

The pair wrote and starred in a new play The Comeback at the Noël Coward Theatre in London's West End which opened on 8 December 2020 during the COVID-19 pandemic (with a socially distanced audience). The run was due to end on 3 January 2021, however due to the London Tier 3 restrictions announced by the government, the run was paused after 16 December 2020. It reopened on 7 July 2021 and ran until 25 July 2021.

Awards 

The Pin was the 2013 winner of London Sketchfest's prize for 'Best Act,' and the first series of their Radio 4 show won them the award for 'Best Comedy' at the 2016 BBC radio awards.

There were nominated for the South Bank Sky Arts Award 'Breakthrough Act' 2021.

References 

English comedy writers
English male comedians
English comedy duos
Comedy theatre characters
Theatre characters introduced in 2013
Comedy film characters
Comedy radio characters
Comedy television characters
Male characters in theatre
Male characters in radio
Male characters in television